Ridgey Didge was a popular Network Ten magazine television programme for children in Australia. The name is an Australian slang term meaning honest, true or the real thing.

Format 

A long-running series of 52-minute programmes, each studio-based episode was intended to be an entertaining voyage of adventure and discovery for the viewers, constantly covering new topics reflecting Australian life and culture. Location segments added to the mix. One episode recorded sealing a time capsule to commemorate Australia's bicentennial in 1988; the capsule was opened in 2001.

Presenters 

A team of presenters hosted each programme:
 Jared Robinsen
 Rebecca Hetherington (daughter of Norman Hetherington)
 Simon Watt
 Danny Carretti
 Chris Harriott
 Ashley Paske

They were joined by puppet characters
 Shaun the Sheep (operated by Danny Carretti)
 Buzz the Blowfly (operated by Simon Watt)

Other presenters of regular segments:
 Dr. Glenn Singleman (medicine)
 Dean Taylor (art)

Catchphrase 

The lyrics in the signature tune repeated the words ridgey didge several times which became a catchphrase amongst the target audience. This was accompanied with a hand gesture. The three middle fingers of the right hand were closed, leaving the thumb and little finger extended; the hand was then twisted from side to side in time with the rhythm of the music.

Transmission 

The show aired between 1987 and 1989, Monday to Friday at 4 p.m. on Network TEN!

The competition 

 Wombat — Seven Network
 C'mon Kids — Nine Network
 Play School — ABC Television

Production crew
Produced by the in-house production department based at the TEN studios in North Ryde, New South Wales, Australia:

 Executive producer — Ian Fairweather
 Producer — Penni-Anne Smith
 Production manager — Dawn Aronie
 Writers — Tammy Burnstock, Simon Watt
 Location director — Lou Petho
 Production assistant — Michael Carrington
 Production assistant — Deborah Kingsford

External links
 
 
 wiktionary:ridgy-didge
 Facebook page

Network 10 original programming
Australian children's television series
Australian non-fiction television series
1987 Australian television series debuts
1989 Australian television series endings